Calesidesma is a monotypic moth genus of the family Erebidae. Its only species, Calesidesma fraternella, is found in Taiwan. Both the genus and the species were first described by Strand in 1920.

References

Calpinae
Monotypic moth genera